Endre Tihanyi (29 January 1945 – 15 December 2022) was a Hungarian gymnast. He competed in eight events at the 1968 Summer Olympics.

Tihanyi died in Budapest on 15 December 2022, at the age of 77.

References

1945 births
2022 deaths
Hungarian male artistic gymnasts
Olympic gymnasts of Hungary
Gymnasts at the 1968 Summer Olympics
Gymnasts from Budapest